Kiss tha Game Goodbye is the debut studio album by American rapper Jadakiss. The album was released on August 7, 2001, by Ruff Ryders Entertainment and Interscope Records. The album debuted at number five on the US Billboard 200 and number two on the Top R&B/Hip-Hop Albums chart.

Commercial performance
The album debuted at number five on the US Billboard 200 selling 204,000 copies in its first week. It was eventually certified gold by the Recording Industry Association of America (RIAA) for sales of over 500,000 copies in the United States. As of June 2004, the album has sold 877,000 copies.

Track listing

Personnel

 Swizz Beatz - production (2, 12, 15); co-production (14)
 Icepick - production (1, 7, 11)
 Mahogany - production (3, 20)
 The Alchemist - production (5, 19)
 Jadakiss - production (11, 21)
 The Neptunes - production (4)
 DJ Premier - production (6)
 Grimy - production (7)
 P.K. - production (8)
 Timbaland - production (9)
 Wayne-O - production (10)
 Sheek - production (11)
 DJ Shok - production (13)
 Eric McCaine - production (14)
 Just Blaze - production (16)
 Fiend - production (17)
 Rated R - production (18)
 Mas - production (18)
 Chucky Thompson - production (20)

Charts

Weekly charts

Year-end charts

Certifications

References

2001 debut albums
Jadakiss albums
Interscope Records albums
Albums produced by Timbaland
Albums produced by the Neptunes
Albums produced by Swizz Beatz
Albums produced by Just Blaze
Albums produced by the Alchemist (musician)
Albums produced by DJ Premier
Ruff Ryders Entertainment albums